The Accounts Commission for Scotland is an executive non-departmental public body of the Scottish Government. The Commission audits Scottish local government and associated public bodies.

With the passing of the Public Finance and Accountability (Scotland) Act 2000 the Commission's staff were transferred to Audit Scotland, and it has not been allowed to incur costs. The board of the Commission is serviced by Audit Scotland staff, with expenses being covered by charging audited bodies.

References

External links

Scotland
Executive non-departmental public bodies of the Scottish Government
Organisations based in Edinburgh
Local government in Scotland
Public finance of Scotland